Chabad customs and holidays are the practices, rituals and holidays performed and celebrated by adherents of the Chabad-Lubavitch Hasidic movement. The customs, or minhagim and prayer services are based on Lurianic kabbalah. The holidays are celebrations of events in Chabad history. General Chabad customs, called minhagim, distinguish the movement from other Hasidic groups.

Customs
Forms of dress – Chabad males, starting from Bar Mitzvah age, mostly wear black fedoras. This is in contrast to other Hasidic groups who wear shtreimels, a type of fur hat. Chabad women, like other Orthodox Jews, wear clothing that conform to tzniut (Hebrew: צניעות, "modesty").
Speech and language – Many Chabad Hasidim in English speaking countries speak both English and Yiddish.
Dialects – Many American Chabad Hasidim pronounce Hebrew according to the Lithuanian dialect. However, many native Israeli Chabad Hasidim pronounce Hebrew according to the Modern Israeli Hebrew dialect.
Linguistic features – English speaking adherents are thought to use a cluster of linguistic features including a “/t/ release” at the end of some words, borrowed Hebrew terms, and “chanting intonation contours”. This linguistic cluster forms a unique "learned, Orthodox style” used by male adherents, and to a lesser extent, by female adherents.
Code-switching – In Chabad, code-switching, or the alternating between two or more languages in speech occurs among English speaking members of the movement. Chabad adherents switch between standard English and a "Jewish English" which is a Jewish variety of English with influences from Yiddish, textual Hebrew and modern Hebrew.
Song and music – Like many other Hasidic groups, Chabad attaches importance to singing Chabad Hasidic nigunim (melodies), usually without words, and following precise customs of their leaders. To Chabad followers, the niggun is a primary link between the mundane and divine realms. Chabad followers also compose songs using lyrics and contemporary styles.
Zemiros – Unlike other Orthodox communities, the Chabad prayerbook does not include Shabbos Zemiros, songs traditionally sung on the Sabbath. The Chabad community is thought to replace these songs with their own niggunim (wordless melodies), or with the recitation of Hasidic discourses.
Daily study – Among the customs of the Chabad movement are schedules of daily study of Jewish religious works. These study schedules were often encouraged by Rabbi Menachem Mendel Schneerson. They include:
Chitas – selected portions of the Torah, Psalms and Tanya, the central book of Chabad theology. The practice was founded by Yosef Yitzchak Schneersohn.
Rambam – selected portions from either Maimonides's Mishneh Torah (Yad Hachazakah) or his Sefer Hamitzvot. The practice was founded by Menachem Mendel Schneersohn.
Pregnancy – Chabad Hasidim refrain from publicizing a pregnancy until the woman has entered the fifth month.
Bar Mitzvah – It is customary in Chabad communities for a child celebrating his Bar Mitzvah to recite the Chassidic discourse titled Isa b'Midrash Tehillim.
Tefillin – The custom of Chabad males, starting from Bar Mitzvah age, is to don an additional pair of Tefillin, called "Tefillin of Rabbeinu Tam".
The Ten Commandments – It is customary in Chabad for all family members, even infants, to attend the reading of the Ten Commandments on the holiday of Shavuot.
Passover – It is customary in Chabad communities, on passover, to limit contact of matzah (an unleavened bread eaten on passover) with water. This custom is called gebrokts (lit. 'broken'). However, on the last day of passover, it is customary to intentionally have matzah come in contact with water.
The Four Questions – The Chabad custom for the order of the "Four Questions", a customary recitation where the child asks the parent what makes Passover unique, differs from the order in the standard Orthodox custom. The Chabad order is as follows: 1. Dipping the food 2. Eating matzah 3. Eating bitter herbs 4. Reclining.
Chanukah – It is the custom of Chabad Hasidim to place the Chanukah menorah against the room's doorpost (and not on the windowsill).
Synagogue readings — In some Lubavitcher congregations, the daily entry in the book Hayom Yom (a book of Hasidic sayings compiled by the seventh Chabad Rebbe) is read aloud after the morning service. This practice serves to provide words of guidance and inspiration as one prepares to leave the synagogue. This post-prayer reading seems to be a more common practice in Chabad communities in North and South America, and less common in Israel.

Holidays
There are a number of days marked by the Chabad movement as special days. Major holidays include the liberation dates of the leaders of the movement, the Rebbes of Chabad, others corresponded to the leaders' birthdays, anniversaries of death, and other life events.

Some holidays overlap, as two events have occurred on the same day.

Liberation dates
The leaders of the Chabad movement were, at times, subject to imprisonment by the Russian government. The days marking the leaders' release, are celebrated by the Chabad movement as "Days of Liberation" (Hebrew: יום גאולה (Yom Geulah)). There are three such events celebrated each year:
Yud Tes Kislev – (19 Kislev) The liberation of Rabbi Shneur Zalman of Liadi, the founder of the Chabad movement. The day is also called the "New Year of Hasidism".
Yud Kislev – (10 Kislev) The liberation of Rabbi Dovber Schneuri, the second rebbe of Chabad.
Gimmel Tammuz – (3 Tammuz) The initial liberation of Rabbi Yosef Yitzchak Schneersohn, the sixth rebbe of Chabad.
Yud Beis-Yud Gimmel Tammuz – (12-13 Tammuz) The final liberation of Rabbi Yosef Yitzchak Schneersohn, the sixth rebbe of Chabad.

Birthdays
The birthdays of the movement's leaders are celebrated each year:
Chai Elul – (18 Elul) The birthday of Rabbi Shneur Zalman of Liadi, the founder of the Chabad movement (also the birthday of Rabbi Israel Baal ShemTov, the founder of the general hasidic movement).
Tes Kislev – (9 Kislev) The birthday of Rabbi Dovber Schneuri, the second rebbe of Chabad.
Yud Aleph Nissan – (11 Nissan) The birthday of Rabbi Menachem Mendel Schneerson, the seventh rebbe of Chabad.<ref>Dade Jews throw birthday party for New York Rabbi, David Hancock, Miami Herald, April 14, 1992</ref>Beis Iyar – (2 Iyar) The birthday of Rabbi Shmuel Schneersohn, the fourth rebbe.Chof Tes Elul - (29 Elul) The birthday of Rabbi Menachem Mendel Schneerson, known as the Tzemach Tzedek, the third rebbe.Chof Cheshvan - (20 Cheshvan) The birthday of Rabbi Sholom Dovber Schneerson, the fifth rebbe.Yud Beis Tammuz - (12 Tammuz) The birthday of Rabbi Yosef Yitzchak Schneerson, the sixth rebbe and father-in-law of the Rebbe.

Anniversaries of death
The anniversaries of death, or yartzeit, of several of the movement's leaders (and in one instance, the leader's wife), are celebrated each year:Chof Daled Teves (24 Tevet) – The yartzeit of Rabbi Shneur Zalman of Liadi, the founder of the Chabad movement.Chassidim unite in Chicago for Chof Daled Teves. CrownHeights.info.Tes Kislev – (9 Kislev) The yartzeit of Rabbi Dovber Schneuri, the second rebbe of Chabad.Yud Gimmel Nissan - (13 Nissan) The Yahrtzeit of Rabbi Menachem Mendel Schneersohn, the third rebbe of chabad.Yud Gimmel Tishrei - (13 Tishrei) The Yahrtzeit of Rabbi Shmuel Schneersohn, the fourth rebbe of chabad.Beis Nissan - (2 Nissan) The Yahrtzeit of Rabbi Sholom DovBer Schneersohn, the fifth rebbe of chabad.Yud Shvat – (10 Shvat) The yartzeit of Rabbi Yosef Yitzchak Schneersohn, the sixth rebbe of Chabad.Chof Beis Shvat – (22 Shvat) The yartzeit of Chaya Mushka Schneerson, the wife of Rabbi Menachem Mendel Schneerson.Gimmel Tammuz – The yartzeit of Rabbi Menachem Mendel Schneerson, the seventh rebbe of Chabad.A Brief Biography. Chabad.org.

Other events
Other significant Chabad holidays commemorate individual incidents involving the Chabad rebbes:Rosh Chodesh Kislev (1 Kislev) – Marking Rabbi Menachem Mendel's recovery from a massive heart attack in 1977.Hei Teves (5 Tevet) – Marking the outcome of the court case over the ownership of the Chabad library, and the return of the stolen books. (See Library of Agudas Chassidei Chabad#"Hey Teves" lawsuit)Tes Vav Elul (15 Elul) – Marking the founding of Tomchei Tmimim also known as "Chodorom".Yud Shevat'' (10 Shevat) - Marking the day that the seventh Rebbe of Lubavitch (Rabbi Menachem Mendel Schnerson) Accepted the Chabad Leadership in 1951(Also the date of the sixth Lubavitcher Rebbe's passing in 1950).

See also
Chabad
Jewish customs

References

Chabad-Lubavitch (Hasidic dynasty)